Bubalo is a Serbo-Croatian-Bosnian surname, borne by ethnic Serbs, Croats and Bosniaks in Serbia, Croatia and Bosnia and Herzegovina. The word buba means "bug" or "beetle", and is derived from a pejorative nickname, based on character traits of its first bearers. At least 343 individuals with the surname died at the Jasenovac concentration camp.

It may refer to:

Klaudija Bubalo (born 1970), retired Croatian handball player
Krešimir Bubalo (born 1973), Croatian politician, Mayor of Osijek, his home city
Milan Bubalo (born 1990), Serbian footballer
Predrag Bubalo (born 1954), the former Serbian Minister of Industry and Privatization
Stanko Bubalo (born 1973), Croatian football striker

See also
Babalu (disambiguation)
Bebuloh
Bubalu
Bubbaloo
Bubulo

References

Croatian surnames
Serbian surnames
Bosnian surnames